
Gmina Nowa Dęba is an urban-rural gmina (administrative district) in Tarnobrzeg County, Subcarpathian Voivodeship, in south-eastern Poland.

Villages 
Apart from the town of Nowa Dęba, Gmina Nowa Dęba contains the villages and settlements of Alfredówka, Chmielów, Cygany, Jadachy, Rozalin and Tarnowska Wola.

Neighbouring gminas 
Gmina Nowa Dęba is bordered by the city of Tarnobrzeg and by the gminas of Baranów Sandomierski, Bojanów, Grębów and Majdan Królewski.

References 
 Polish official population figures 2006

Nowa Deba
Tarnobrzeg County